Saddam Haftar is a Libyan politician and son of Khalifa Haftar. He is commander of the Tariq Ben Zeyad Brigade and holds several other high positions in his father's Libyan National Arab Army. He frequently travels abroad to make diplomatic visits to Arab and foreign countries and has been seen as the likely successor to his father.

Military 
He has been commander of the Tariq Ben Zeyad Brigade since its emergence in 2016, which has been accused of crushing any opposition to his father's Libyan Arab Armed Forces and of terrorizing people by committing "unlawful killings, torture and other ill-treatment, enforced disappearance, rape and other sexual violence, and forced displacement — with no fear of consequences". He established the 106th Brigade as a pretorian guard to protect his father and keep tribal militias under LAAF control, and with this he succeeded in recapturing Benghazi in December 2017. In December 2016, Saddam Haftar appeared at a military ceremony in Jordan during the graduation of the students of the Military College, wearing a military uniform. He was granted the ranks of Major and then Lieutenant-Colonel in an exceptional promotion granted to him by the Speaker of the Libyan Parliament, Aguila Saleh. Shortly thereafter, Saddam Haftar was promoted to the rank of Colonel, surpassing Gaddafi himself. In December 2022, Saddam's Tariq Ben Zeyad Brigade was accused by the Amnesty International of committing war crimes.

Finance 
Saddam Haftar was injured during clashes in Tripoli in 2012 following a failed attempt to control the "Aman" bank. Immediately after he recaptured Benghazi in December 2017, Saddam ordered his men to transfer about 160 million Euros, 639 million Libyan dinars, two million US dollars and 6,000 silver coins from the Central Bank branch in Benghazi to an unknown destination, which has been described as "one of the largest bank heists in history". In December 2022, Saddam Haftar attempted to seize control of banking institutions in Cyrenaica. Saddam's strong control over eastern Libya's banking sector would allow him to finance his forces, equipment and operations.

Politics 
On 1 November 2021, Saddam Haftar reportedly visited Tel Aviv for a secret meeting with Israeli officials, allegedly seeking to establish diplomatic relations in return for Israeli "military and diplomatic assistance". It is unknown who he met there, and Libya and Israel currently have no diplomatic relations. Later that same month, Saddam Haftar allegedly guaranteed the safety of Saif al-Islam Gaddafi and Bashir Saleh to register themselves as president candidates in Sabha. Ten days later, the Tariq Ben Zeyad Brigade, led by Saddam and Khalid, stormed the courthouse in Sabha to prevent judges from hearing Saif al-Islam Gaddafi's appeal to participate in the presidential election. The gunmen used arms against the staffers and judges and then kicked them out. In January 2023, Khalifa Haftar pledged to withdraw from the Libyan presidential election on the condition that his sons Saddam and Belqasim are allowed to run. Saddam Haftar is seen as the heir apparent of Khalifa Haftar.

References 

1991 births
National Liberation Army (Libya)
People of the Second Libyan Civil War
21st-century military personnel
21st-century Libyan people
Living people